Alain Vasseur (1 April 1948) was a French professional road bicycle racer. Alain Vasseur is the younger brother of cyclist Sylvain Vasseur, and the father of cyclists Cédric Vasseur and Loïc Vasseur. He competed in the individual road race at the 1968 Summer Olympics.

Major results

1969
Four Days of Dunkirk
1970
Tour de France:
Winner stage 8

References

External links

Official Tour de France results for Alain Vasseur

1948 births
Living people
French male cyclists
French Tour de France stage winners
Sportspeople from Dunkirk
Olympic cyclists of France
Cyclists at the 1968 Summer Olympics
Cyclists from Hauts-de-France